Kibworth railway station was opened by the Midland Railway in 1857 on what is now the Midland Main Line.

History
Plans had been made earlier in 1847 for a line from Leicester to Bedford, but had lapsed.  However the Midland, running to Rugby at that time and dependent on the LNWR for its path into London, was looking for an alternative. It revived its plans for Bedford to go forward to Hitchin to join the Great Northern Railway.

The station was near the summit of the Kibworth Incline, the most northerly of the Leicester to Hitchin section. It was built next to the bridge carrying  the highway from Kibworth Beauchamp, still known at Station Street, and access was by means of wooden stairs to each platform. The station buildings were of brick in the Midland Ecclesiastical Gothic style. The booking office and other facilities were on the down (northbound) platform, with a small waiting-room on the southbound.

On the down side were two bay platforms, one running through a goods shed.  These joined the running lines by a crossing, but also led back to longer sidings next to the down line. Next to the up line on the other side of the road bridge, was a short loop serving a cattle dock, and an unusual siding curving away from the running lines to some small sheds.

At grouping in 1923 it became part of the London Midland and Scottish Railway.

Goods services ended on 4 July 1966, and the station closed to passengers on 1 January 1968.

In recent years, it has housed a fencing and wood merchants business but became empty in 2002.

In the early 2000s,a number of houses were built on the car park. At some point, access to the line was removed, as were the platforms.

Stationmasters

Caleb Porter 1857 - 1863 (afterwards station master at Lowham)
R. Peddle 1864 (formerly station master at Lowdham)
T. Turner 1864 - 1866 (formerly station master at Millers Dale, afterwards station master at Thrapston)
John William Jones 1866 - 1902
Alfred William Kingdon 1902 - 1918 (formerly station master at Great Glen)
Charles William Marshall 1918 - 1924 (formerly station master at Leagrave)
John Jefferson 1924 - 1925
Lester Ireson ca. 1926, ca. 1927
J.L. Hadfield 1929 - 1935 (also station master of Great Glen, afterwards station master at Corby)
William Hankins 1935 - ca. 1938 (formerly station master at Seaton, also station master of Great Glen)
H.E. Harrison until 1955 (afterwards station master at SIleby)
L.F. Crewson ca. 1958
Brian Edge (formerly station master at East Langton)

References

Disused railway stations in Leicestershire
Railway stations in Great Britain opened in 1857
Railway stations in Great Britain closed in 1968
Former Midland Railway stations
Beeching closures in England
Charles Henry Driver railway stations
1857 establishments in England
Harborough District